Pittosporopsis is a genus of flowering plants belonging to the family Icacinaceae.

Its native range is Southern Central China to Indo-China.

Species:
 Pittosporopsis kerrii Craib

References

Icacinaceae
Asterid genera
Taxa named by William Grant Craib